Kevin Corby is an American soccer player. He was born and raised in the St. Louis area and attended St. Louis University High School while playing for various youth and amateur sides of local club powerhouse St. Louis Scott Gallagher. He began his college career with the Kentucky Wildcats before transferring to the University of Missouri-Kansas City for his final three years of eligibility.

Corby was a reserve goalkeeper for the St. Louis Ambush of the Major Arena Soccer League during the 2014–15 season. In early 2015, Corby was invited to the preseason training camp of USL club Charleston Battery and was signed to a professional contract following impressive performances in the Carolina Challenge Cup. Serving as a backup to Odisnel Cooper, Corby made 8 league appearances in 2015 and earned 2 shutouts.

External links
https://web.archive.org/web/20150531160900/http://charlestonbattery.com/players/kevin-corby/

1991 births
Living people
American soccer players
Kentucky Wildcats men's soccer players
Charleston Battery players
Soccer players from St. Louis
Major Arena Soccer League players
Association football goalkeepers
USL Championship players
St. Louis Ambush (2013–) players
Kansas City Roos men's soccer players